Shipman is a census-designated place (CDP) in Nelson County, Virginia, United States. The population as of the 2010 Census was 507.

Bon Aire and the Oak Ridge Railroad Overpass are listed on the National Register of Historic Places.

References

Virginia Trend Report 2: State and Complete Places (Sub-state 2010 Census Data)

Census-designated places in Nelson County, Virginia